The constitution guarantees freedom of the press, but in practise the threat of government censorship generally prevents opposition viewpoints from appearing in print, especially in the government-controlled press.

Censorship and harassment of journalists is common in Cameroon. The government has been implicated in recent efforts to block access to Twitter within the country. Newspaper editor Raphaël Nkamtcheun was detained for receiving allegedly confidential government documents from former finance minister Polycarpe Abah Abah when he visited Abah in Yaoundé prison on February 17, 2011, an incident that Reporters Without Borders condemned as arbitrary intimidation. Cameroun Express editor Ngota Ngota Germain (aka Bibi Ngota) died in Yaoundé's Kondengui Central Prison on April 22, 2011, an incident opponents cite as government intimidation; other reporters subjected to arrest and incarceration without being charged include editors Serge Sabouang of the bimonthly La Nation and Robert Mintya of the weekly Le Devoir.

In 2009, the freedom of the press global classification released each year by Reporters Without Borders ranked Cameroon 109 out of 175 countries. "Sensitive issues" were reported there.

88 proposals to create private radio and television services are under examination by the Minister of Communication.

References 

Freedom of speech
Politics of Cameroon